Michael Molloy may refer to:

Mike Molloy (born 1940), British author and former newspaper editor and cartoonist
M. J. Molloy (1917–1994), Irish playwright
Mick Molloy (born 1966), Australian comedian, writer and producer
Michael Molloy (politician) (1850–1926), Member of Parliament for Carlow County, 1910–1918

See also
Michael Malloy (1873–1933), Irish vagrant murdered in New York City